This article is about the particular significance of the year 1826 to Wales and its people.

Incumbents
Lord Lieutenant of Anglesey – Henry Paget, 1st Marquess of Anglesey 
Lord Lieutenant of Brecknockshire – Henry Somerset, 6th Duke of Beaufort
Lord Lieutenant of Caernarvonshire – Thomas Assheton Smith
Lord Lieutenant of Cardiganshire – William Edward Powell
Lord Lieutenant of Carmarthenshire – George Rice, 3rd Baron Dynevor 
Lord Lieutenant of Denbighshire – Sir Watkin Williams-Wynn, 5th Baronet    
Lord Lieutenant of Flintshire – Robert Grosvenor, 1st Marquess of Westminster 
Lord Lieutenant of Glamorgan – John Crichton-Stuart, 2nd Marquess of Bute 
Lord Lieutenant of Merionethshire – Sir Watkin Williams-Wynn, 5th Baronet
Lord Lieutenant of Montgomeryshire – Edward Clive, 1st Earl of Powis
Lord Lieutenant of Pembrokeshire – Sir John Owen, 1st Baronet
Lord Lieutenant of Radnorshire – George Rodney, 3rd Baron Rodney

Bishop of Bangor – Henry Majendie 
Bishop of Llandaff – William Van Mildert (until 24 April); Charles Sumner (from 21 May) 
Bishop of St Asaph – John Luxmoore 
Bishop of St Davids – John Jenkinson

Events
30 January - Opening of the Menai Suspension Bridge, designed by Thomas Telford.
1 July - Opening of Telford's Conwy Suspension Bridge.
Wrexham Maelor Hospital's predecessor founded.
The Calvinistic Methodist "connexion" produces its Constitutional Deed.  It incorporates all property (such as chapels) as the property of the connexion as a whole.

Arts and literature

New books
Daniel Evans (Daniel Ddu o Geredigion) - Golwg ar Gyflwr yr Iddewon, Cerdd
James Humphreys - Observations on the Actual State of the English Laws of Real Property, with the outlines of a Code

Music
24 May - John Parry (Bardd Alaw) is given a benefit concert by the Society of Cymmrodorion.

Births
13 January (in Ceylon) - Henry Matthews, 1st Viscount Llandaff (d. 1913)
10 February - Edward Williams, iron-master (d. 1886)
26 February - John Llewelyn Davies, English theologian of Welsh parentage (d. 1916)
1 March - John Thomas, harpist (d. 1913)
22 March - Lewys Glyn Dyfi (Lewis Meredith), poet and preacher (d. 1891)
27 April - Owen Phillips, Dean of St Davids (d. 1897)
8 May - George Osborne Morgan, lawyer (d. 1897)
11 May - David Charles Davies, Nonconformist leader (d. 1891)
26 June - Evan Davies, educationalist and lawyer (died 1872)
18 December - Henry Parry, Anglican bishop of Welsh parentage (d. 1893 in Australia)

Deaths
April - Ned Turner, prize-fighter, 34
21 April - Thomas Johnes, clergyman, chancellor and canon of Exeter, about 76
May (approximate) - Richard Griffiths, industrial pioneer who opened up transport links into the Rhondda, 70
October - John Williams, clergyman, teacher and collector of manuscripts, about 76
7 December - John Vivian, industrialist, 76
18 December - Iolo Morganwg, poet and antiquary, 79
28 December - Nathaniel Williams, theologian and hymn-writer, 84

References

 
Wales
 Wales